Ezra Binyomin Schochet is an Orthodox rabbi and Lubavitcher Hasid who serves as rosh yeshiva (dean) of Yeshiva Ohr Elchonon Chabad/West Coast Talmudical Seminary in Los Angeles, California, US.

Early life and education
Ezra Binyomin Schochet is one of six sons and four daughters of Rabbi Dov Yehuda Schochet (d. 1974) and Sara Sosha Mussensohn. His father was the Chief Rabbi of Basel, Switzerland from 1930 until 1947. Shortly after immigrating to Toronto in the early 1950s, the Schochets and most of their children joined the Chabad-Lubavitch movement, including young Ezra. His brothers included Rabbi Dr. Jacob Immanuel Schochet (1935-2013).

Schochet undertook his yeshiva education at Ner Israel Rabbinical College (1959-1960) in Baltimore, MD, Beth Medrash Govoha (1960–1963) in Lakewood, New Jersey, and Yeshivas Brisk in Jerusalem, Israel (1963-1966). After his marriage, he studied at the Kollel of Radomsk in Bnei Brak (1967-1972). He received rabbinic ordination from both the Tel Aviv Rabbinical Court and the Jerusalem Rabbinical Court between 1971 and 1972.

Rosh Yeshiva

Rabbi Schochet assumed the position of rosh yeshiva of Tomchei Temimim in Lod, Israel, from 1972 to 1973. He returned to Canada and headed the kollel of Ner Israel in Toronto from 1974 to 1978.

In 1977, he became rosh yeshiva of Yeshiva Ohr Elchonon in Los Angeles, which had been given over to the directorship of Chabad. Chabad transferred a group of Lubavitcher students from New York to bolster the yeshiva. Schochet is also the yeshiva's CEO, curriculum supervisor, and senior professor of Talmud.

Personal
Schochet married Sara Rochel Weinberg (1944–2010), a granddaughter of the Slonimer Rebbe, in 1967. Weinberg died in 2010. In 2011 Schochet married Batsheva Wolf from Israel.

Rabbi Schochet has three sons and three daughters. His son Rabbi Avraham Shmuel Shochet, an acclaimed Talmudic scholar, teaches in his father's Yeshiva. Two of Schochet's son-in-laws, as well as some of his grandchildren, are part of the Yeshiva faculty.

References

External links
"The Power of Torah Study" videotaped speech by Rabbi Ezra Schochet, Yarchei Kallah 5772 (2012)
 (video) January 6, 2013

Hasidic rosh yeshivas
Chabad-Lubavitch rabbis
American Hasidic rabbis
20th-century American rabbis
21st-century American rabbis
Beth Medrash Govoha alumni
Clergy from Toronto
Rabbis from Los Angeles
Year of birth missing (living people)